The men's shot put at the 2015 World Championships in Athletics was held at the Beijing National Stadium on 23 August.

As the best thrower in a decade, Joe Kovacs looked to be the favorite, though David Storl was the two-time defending champion.  With his first throw Kovacs took the lead at 21.23.  Storl raised the lead to 21.46 on his second throw.  But the surprise leader at the end of the third round was O'Dayne Richards equalling his Jamaican National Record from the Pan American Games at 21.69.  In the fourth round, Tomas Walsh threw his Continental Record 21.58 to take the second position.  A few throws later, Kovacs moved into second place with his 21.67 fourth throw.  The medals were settled in the fifth round when Kovacs threw the 21.93 winner, followed immediately by Storl throwing his 21.74 silver medal winner.

Records
Prior to the competition, the records were as follows:

Qualification standards

Schedule

Results

Qualification
Qualification: 20.65 m (Q) or at least best 12 performers (q).

Final
The final was started at 19:30.

References

Shot put
Shot put at the World Athletics Championships